The Battle of Macta was fought on 28 June 1835 between French forces under General Camille Alphonse Trézel and a coalition of Algerian tribes of western Algeria under Emir Abd al-Qadir, who, at the age of 26, waged one of his most epic and famous battles using new strategies and tactics of warfare unheard of by the settlers. 

The French column, which had fought an inconclusive but somewhat bloody battle with Abdul-Qadir a few days earlier, was retreating toward Arzew to resupply when Abdul-Qadir attacked in the marshes on the banks of the Macta River in what is now western Algeria.
The French panicked and fled to Arzew in a disorganized rout. The Algerians piled the heads of their defeated French enemies in a pyramid, allegedly hundreds in total.

The disaster led to the recall to France of Trézel and the comte d'Erlon, the first military governor-general of the French possessions in Africa, and helped Abdul-Qadir gain influence over tribes throughout Algeria.

Notes

References

Further reading

Battles involving France
Battles involving Algeria
French Algeria
1835 in Algeria
Conflicts in 1835
19th century in Africa
Battles involving the French Foreign Legion
June 1835 events